Bernard and Huey is a 2017 American drama/comedy film directed by Dan Mirvish, that was written by Jules Feiffer based on characters Feiffer created for his eponymous comic strip in The Village Voice. Feiffer, originally wrote the screenplay in 1986, and it was mused lost for close to three decades.   The film stars David Koechner, Jim Rash, Sasha Alexander, Eka Darville, Richard Kind, Lauren Miller Rogen, Nancy Travis, Bellamy Young, Mae Whitman.

Cast
Jim Rash as Bernard
David Koechner as Huey
Sasha Alexander as Roz
Eka Darville as Conrad
Richard Kind as Marty
Lauren Miller Rogen as Stephanie
Nancy Travis as Mona
Bellamy Young as Aggie
Mae Whitman as Zelda

Release
The film had its world premiere at the Oldenburg International Film Festival. Freestyle Digital Media, which is owned by Byron Allen, acquired all U.S. and Canadian rights to the film in January 2018 and plans on a theatrical release starting June 8.

Festivals
'Bernard and Huey' has screened at over 25 film festivals and won the grand jury prize at the 2017 Guam International Film Festival. The film won the "Best Screenplay" award at the Manchester Film Festival, the "Best Film from the American Continent" (sic) award at the Jaipur International Film Festival and was the Closing Night Film at the Slamdance Film Festival.

'Bernard and Huey' was selected to screen at the following film festivals:
2017 Oldenburg International Film Festival
2017 Festival du Nouveau Cinema
2017 Sao Paulo International Film Festival
2017 Tallinn Black Nights Film Festival
2018 Slamdance Film Festival
2017 Whistler Film Festival.
2017 Cork Film Festival
2017 Rome Independent Film Festival
2018 Barbados Independent Film Festival
2017 Napa Valley Film Festival
2017 Denver Film Festival
2017 Cucalorus Film Festival
2017 St. Louis Film Festival
2017 Virginia Film Festival
2018 Cinequest Film Festival

References

External links

2017 films
2010s English-language films
2010s buddy comedy-drama films
2017 independent films
American independent films
Films with screenplays by Jules Feiffer
Films based on comic strips
Live-action films based on comics
Kickstarter-funded films
American buddy comedy-drama films
2017 comedy films
2017 drama films
2010s American films